Siepietnica  is a village in the administrative district of Gmina Skołyszyn, within Jasło County, Subcarpathian Voivodeship, in south-eastern Poland.

References

External links
 Website

Siepietnica